The 1983 FIA Formula One World Championship was  the 37th season of FIA Formula One motor racing. It featured the 1983 Formula One World Championship for Drivers and the 1983 Formula One World Championship for Constructors, which were contested concurrently over a fifteen-race series that commenced on 13 March and ended on 15 October. Nelson Piquet won the Drivers' Championship, his second Formula One title and the first to be won by a driver using a turbocharged engine, while Ferrari won the Constructors' Championship. It was also the last Drivers' Championship won by a Brabham driver.

The Drivers' Championship developed into a four-way battle between Brabham-BMW driver Piquet, Renault driver Alain Prost and Ferrari duo René Arnoux and Patrick Tambay. Prost led the championship from the Belgian Grand Prix in May until the final race in South Africa in October, where a turbo problem forced him to retire and thus enabled Piquet to snatch the title. Ferrari won the Constructors' Championship despite its better driver, Arnoux, finishing only third overall – a unique feat in Formula One history.

The season also included a single non-championship Formula One race, the Race of Champions, which was held at Brands Hatch and won by defending World Champion Keke Rosberg in a Williams-Ford. This was the last non-championship race in Formula One history.

Drivers and constructors
The following drivers and constructors contested the 1983 FIA Formula One World Championship.

FIA World Championship season review

Pre-season
Williams retained defending world champion Keke Rosberg, but their number two seat, which had been occupied on a temporary basis by both Mario Andretti and Derek Daly in  after the departure of Carlos Reutemann, was filled for 1983 by Ligier's Jacques Laffite. During the season Frank Williams signed an exclusive deal to use the turbocharged Honda V6 engines in his cars to replace the Cosworth DFV. Honda engines first appeared in the back of a Williams at the season-ending South African Grand Prix.

Ligier also lost Eddie Cheever to Renault. Team boss Guy Ligier replaced them with Jean-Pierre Jarier, signed from Osella, and Raul Boesel, formerly of March. Jarier would gain a reputation through the season as a "mobile chicane". Ligier also lost the use of the V12 Matra engines and were forced to use the Cosworth DFV.

Osella filled Jarier's seat with Corrado Fabi, the younger brother of Teo Fabi, who had raced for Toleman in 1982. Fabi was joined by fellow Italian debutante Piercarlo Ghinzani, who filled the seat which had been vacant since Riccardo Paletti's death in Canada.

The March team united with RAM Racing and became RAM March. As well as Boesel, Rupert Keegan was also replaced by the team, who shrunk to just one car, for Eliseo Salazar of ATS. The German team were also reduced to one car, run for Manfred Winkelhock who had driven alongside Salazar in 1982.

Tyrrell kept Michele Alboreto as their team leader after the Italian won for the first time at the last race of 1982. They replaced Brian Henton in the other car with 33-year-old American rookie Danny Sullivan, allegedly at the request of team sponsor Benetton.

The Brabham, McLaren and Lotus teams all retained both of their 1982 drivers – Nelson Piquet and Riccardo Patrese for Brabham, John Watson and Niki Lauda with McLaren and Elio de Angelis and Nigel Mansell at Lotus. Late in the season McLaren would abandon the Cosworth DFV engine in favor of a 1.5 Litre, turbocharged V6 TAG engine. Brabham also went the turbo route, though unlike McLaren they exclusively used the powerful BMW M12 engine throughout the season and completely abandoned the Cosworth V8.

Lotus would be without team founder Colin Chapman in 1983 after the legendary team boss's sudden death from a heart attack on 16 December 1982 at the age of 54. Chapman's right-hand man Peter Warr took over as team manager. Lotus would also change from using the Cosworth DFV engine to the turbocharged Renault engine during the season after Chapman had secured use of the French engines in late 1982. Although Chapman had given both de Angelis and Mansell equal number one status in the team, Warr, who was never a fan of Mansell, installed the Italian as the number one driver based on the results of 1982 where he had out-performed Mansell.

Renault held on to team leader Alain Prost but lost René Arnoux to Ferrari, and poached Cheever from Ligier to replace him (the rumor mill was that Renault wanted to sell more cars in North America and signing Phoenix native Cheever to the factory team was a good promotional tool as there were 2 races in the United States and one in Canada). Alfa Romeo also kept their team leader, Andrea de Cesaris, but replaced Bruno Giacomelli with Mauro Baldi, signed from Arrows. Alfa had also moved into turbocharging with the 890T V8 engine replacing the V12 it had used for the previous four seasons.

Arrows replaced Baldi with Chico Serra, signed from the remnants of the now-defunct Fittipaldi team, while Marc Surer remained as the lead driver. Serra was replaced by  World Champion Alan Jones in Long Beach (Jones also raced for the team in the non-championship Race of Champions at Brands Hatch). Serra lasted only three more races before he was released from the team after Monaco (team boss Jackie Oliver had wanted to keep Jones after Long Beach but the Australian could not come up with the sponsorship money for the season). Serra was replaced by Belgian driver Thierry Boutsen who made his F1 début in front of his home crowd at Spa for the Belgian Grand Prix.

Ferrari retained Patrick Tambay, who had replaced Gilles Villeneuve after his death in Belgium, but Mario Andretti as a replacement for the injured Didier Pironi was never a permanent solution (in a 2012 Grand Prix Legends interview, Alan Jones revealed that Ferrari had initially contacted him to replace Pironi, but that he regretfully gave them the run around, remembering that Ferrari had gone back on an agreed contract back in 1977. Instead, Ferrari signed Andretti. As Jones was looking to make a full-time comeback to F1 in 1983 it is likely that as a former World Champion driver with 12 Grand Prix wins to his credit, Ferrari would have retained the Australian for the 1983 season had he signed in 1982). Instead, the second Ferrari seat was filled by Tambay's fellow Frenchman, the fast and talented René Arnoux who had defected from Renault.

Theodore broke the trend by expanding from one car to two, but Tommy Byrne, the last of four drivers to drive their car in 1982, was not retained and the seats were filled with two South Americans. Débutante Venezuelan ex-dual Grand Prix motorcycle World Champion Johnny Cecotto was joined by Colombian Roberto Guerrero, a refugee from the defunct Ensign outfit. Ensign was absorbed by Theodore. The Ensign N181Bs were modified to comply with the new rules and rebadged as "Thedore N183s". The team principal Mo Nunn and the designer Nigel Bennett became manager and technical director of Theodore.

Toleman, meanwhile, retained Derek Warwick as their lead driver, but replaced Teo Fabi who was racing IndyCars in 1983 with ex-McLaren and Alfa Romeo driver Bruno Giacomelli.

Early season

Race 1: Brazil
The South African Grand Prix which had started the 1982 season had been moved to the end of the year, and so the season began in Brazil. At the Jacarepagua Riocentro Autodrome in Rio de Janeiro, defending champion Keke Rosberg took pole position, but lost the lead early on to Nelson Piquet and then caught fire during his pitstop. With the fire extinguished, he fought back from ninth to finish second behind Piquet, but was subsequently disqualified for receiving a push start in the pits. This left an unprecedented situation, as the organisers decided not to award second to Niki Lauda, who finished third, but to leave the position vacant. As such, only five drivers scored points, and other than Piquet and Lauda, these were Rosberg's teammate Jacques Laffite, whose presence in fourth was a surprise given his 18th place grid slot. Ferrari had a difficult race and had a best finish of only fifth with Patrick Tambay, who had started third. The final point went to Marc Surer, who had qualified 20th but moved up to 14th by the end of the first lap.

Race 2: United States West
The next race was the first of two to be held in the US, the United States Grand Prix West, held at Long Beach, California. Tambay started the race from pole, and led until lap 25. On that lap, Rosberg attempted to overtake, but the two cars touched and span. Tambay retired, but Rosberg continued in the lead. Soon afterwards, Laffite took the lead, pushing Rosberg into a collision as he did so. The McLaren pair of John Watson and Niki Lauda had started from 22nd and 23rd on the grid, but both Laffite and Patrese were struggling with worn tyres, and were being caught quickly by the McLarens. Patrese attempted to pass Laffite on lap 44 but slid wide, and was passed by both McLarens. They also both found a way past Laffite on the next lap. From there Watson was left to lead home his teammate for a  1–2 victory, and one that still stands as the victory from the lowest qualifying position. Patrese suffered an engine failure three laps from the end, leaving third position to Arnoux, with Laffite following home, a lap down in fourth. The points were rounded out by Surer in the Arrows and Johnny Cecotto in the Theodore. Chico Serra had been replaced in the second Arrows by 1980 World Champion Alan Jones, but the Australian's return to F1 was unsuccessful, and Serra would be back in the car for the next race.

This was the last United States Grand Prix West, as race organiser Chris Pook had decided that Formula One was too expensive. From 1984 onwards, the race would instead be part of the CART IndyCar series.

European spring
As the F1 circus headed to Europe, Lauda led the championship despite not having yet won a race. The two winners, Piquet and Watson, were joint second, just one point behind. This meant that McLaren held a commanding lead in the Constructors' Championship, ten points ahead of Brabham.

Race 3: France
For the French Grand Prix at the Circuit Paul Ricard near Marseille, the RAM team entered a second car for local driver Jean-Louis Schlesser, who failed to qualify.

This race was being held in mid-April instead of its usual late June/early July date, in order to avoid the southern French summer heat. The race was dominated by another home driver, Alain Prost. He took pole position, victory and fastest lap and led all but three laps of the race. These three were led by Piquet during the pit stops; the Brazilian eventually finished second to reclaim his championship lead. Eddie Cheever came home third in the second Renault. Tambay was fourth in front of his home crowd, with the two Williams of Rosberg and Laffite fifth and sixth respectively.

Piquet now led the championship by five points from Lauda, with Watson and Prost just one further point behind. McLaren's lead in the Constructors' Championship had been severely narrowed by their failure to score, and Brabham were now just four points behind, with Renault also in close attendance.

Race 4: San Marino
Arnoux on Ferrari took the  pole position, while his teammate Tambay surged up from the second row to join him at the head of the pack in the opening laps. Local driver Riccardo Patrese, however, overcame them both to put his Brabham in the lead. Despite the best efforts of first Arnoux and then Tambay after they swapped places during the pitstops, he stayed there. On lap 34, Tambay finally found a way past, and he remained in the lead until a small misfire allowed Patrese to take the lead 6 laps from the end on the approach to Tosa. However, on the exit to Aqua Minerale Patrese ran wide and ran into the tyre wall. This allowed Tambay to retake the lead and take the chequered flag, giving Ferrari a win on home ground. Prost passed Arnoux in the last five laps to prevent a Ferrari 1–2 finish. Arnoux came home third, however, to make it an all-French podium, leading home the last points scorers: Rosberg, Watson and Surer yet again. Piquet's failure to score due to an engine failure, a common occurrence for the Brabham-BMWs, meant that he and Prost were now tied at the top of the standings with Tambay only one point behind. The McLaren pair of Watson and Lauda were also in close attendance. Ferrari seized the lead in the Constructors' Championship, but were only separated from McLaren and Renault by a total of three points. Brabham's inconsistency saw them slip to fourth, some way behind.

Race 5: Monaco
Prost took his second pole of the year in Monaco. Arnoux completed an all French front row. However, both were passed at the start by Keke Rosberg who, despite the damp track, took the gamble of starting on slicks while those around him were either on full wets or intermediate tyres, and as Prost dropped back through the field after a few laps the Finn was left with no serious challengers. Despite the rain, and multiple collisions further down the field, including Arnoux, Rosberg led every lap to record his first victory of the year. Jacques Laffite had looked set to record a Williams 1–2, but he was stopped by a gearbox failure. This gave the two remaining podium spots to Piquet and Prost, allowing Piquet to open up a two-point lead in the championship. Tambay was fourth, ahead of Danny Sullivan's Tyrrell and Mauro Baldi's Alfa Romeo. Patrese suffered from an electrics problem ten laps from home.

Prost remained second in the championship, with Tambay only two further points behind. Rosberg's victory moved him up to fourth, while Ferrari retained their lead in the Constructors' Championship, two points ahead of Renault, who were, in turn, two points ahead of Brabham, McLaren and Williams, all on 21.

Race 6: Belgium
The 1983 race was, for Spa-Francorchamps circuit in southern Belgium,  the first time it had hosted a Grand Prix since 1970; although the circuit had been shortened in 1979 to 7 km from 14 km, and had been made a lot safer than its extremely fast original version but had still managed to retain the fast, flowing nature of the old circuit. Zolder and Nivelles had hosted the Belgian Grand Prix for most of the 1970s and early 1980s.

Prost took pole yet again at Spa for the Belgian Grand Prix, although his qualifying performances were not reflected in his points tally at that point in the season. Andrea de Cesaris leapt into the lead from the second row of the grid, and spent the first twenty laps pulling away from Prost. The Italian looked set for a maiden victory before a slow pit stop dropped him to second and engine trouble slowed and finally stopped his Alfa Romeo. This left Prost free to record a victory only briefly challenged by Piquet, who slipped away at the end to fourth. Tambay was second with Cheever third, making it two Renaults on the podium again, while Rosberg and Laffite rounded out the points, their Cosworth powered cars proving no match for the turbo's on the fast Spa layout.

Prost had a four-point lead over Piquet, with Tambay only one further point behind. Renault also assumed the lead in the Constructors' Championship by five points from Ferrari, with Brabham, Williams and McLaren slipping farther behind. Arrows, seemingly determined to get rid of Chico Serra, replaced him for a second time, this time with local rookie Thierry Boutsen. The Belgian, more known at that point for driving sportscars, kept his drive for the rest of the season.

North American tour

Race 7: Detroit
The teams then travelled to Detroit for their customary mid-season visit to North America. The Detroit street circuit had been changed slightly from the previous year's race; a hairpin on Jefferson Avenue and Chrysler Drive had been bypassed and eliminated, so that the course stayed on Chrysler Drive up until it turned left onto Congress Street.

Arnoux scored his second pole of the year, but Piquet took the lead at the start. Arnoux retook the lead on lap 9, and held off both Piquet and Rosberg until the electrics failed on his Ferrari, leaving Piquet back in the lead again. Michele Alboreto's Tyrrell inherited Piquet's lead when the Brazilian developed a slow rear puncture, dropping him to fourth. This was Alboreto's second career victory, both of which had come in the United States. Rosberg came home second with Watson third, while Piquet recovered to finish fourth. Laffite was fifth and Nigel Mansell came home 6th to score Lotus's first point of 1983. Prost's failure to score left him just one point ahead of Piquet with Tambay and Rosberg both in close attendance. Renault's lead in the Constructors' Championship was reduced to four points, with Williams moving into second, one point ahead of Ferrari.

Race 8: Canada
The Canadian Grand Prix at the Circuit Gilles Villeneuve in Montreal a week after Detroit saw the debut of Jacques Villeneuve, brother of the late Gilles Villeneuve. He was given a debut by RAM at his home Grand Prix, replacing Eliseo Salazar. He failed to qualify for the race. Arnoux took pole again and led for most of the race, his lead only being surrendered during the pit stops. He became the year's seventh victor in eight races as he won for Ferrari for the first time. Patrese had looked set for second before yet another technical failure, this time a gearbox failure, saw him continue to fail to score points in 1983. This left Cheever free to come home second, his best result of the year, with Tambay putting the second Ferrari on the podium in third place. Rosberg, Prost and Watson rounded out the points. Prost held on to his championship lead, now just three points, with Tambay and Piquet joint second. Rosberg was just two farther points behind. Renault and Ferrari now held a joint lead in the Constructors' Championship, with Williams, Brabham and McLaren all slipping off the pace.

European summer

Race 9: Britain
The teams returned to Europe for the British Grand Prix at Silverstone, the fastest circuit of the year. Although Salazar had been expected to return to the RAM in place of Villeneuve, British driver Kenny Acheson was hired instead. He performed well enough to retain the seat for the rest of the season. The race also saw the debut of the Honda-funded Spirit team. The team would run a limited programme in 1983 with a view to running a full season in 1984. Stefan Johansson would drive the car. For qualifying Arnoux took his third successive pole position in the brand new Ferrari 126C3. He lost the lead to his teammate Tambay at the start and held second ahead of Prost. Although the Ferraris had a straight-line speed advantage over the Renault, overall Prost was the fastest of the three, and he passed both Arnoux and Tambay by lap 20. But for pit stops, he remained in the lead until the finish. Piquet also overcame the Ferraris before the end to finish second, with Tambay in third. Mansell, with Renault turbo power for the first time in his Lotus, took his best result of the year to be the highest home driver in fourth ahead of Arnoux and Lauda. This allowed both Prost and Renault to extend their championship leads. Piquet was now six points behind, with Tambay two points further back. Rosberg was now more than a victory behind and it was clear that teams without turbo power such as Williams, McLaren, Tyrrell and Ligier were at a significant disadvantage. The Constructors' Championship was becoming a two-horse race, with Renault leading Ferrari by three points.

Race 10: Germany
The next race was the German Grand Prix at the very fast Hockenheim circuit near Stuttgart, and Tambay secured Ferrari's fourth consecutive pole position. He lost the lead to Arnoux early on, however, and later suffered an engine failure to promote Piquet to second. The Brazilian inherited the lead briefly during Arnoux's pit stop, but the Frenchman could not be stopped and recorded his second victory of the year. A fire three laps from home prevented Piquet from picking up second, which instead went to Andrea de Cesaris, collecting some points for Alfa Romeo. Patrese was third, scoring his first points of the year ahead of Prost, Lauda and Watson.

Prost extended his points lead to nine points over Piquet, but both Tambay and Arnoux were nearing. Ferrari also reassumed their points lead, three ahead of Renault.

Race 11: Austria
It was another pole for Tambay and Ferrari in Austria at the fast Österreichring circuit near Graz. He led until the first pit stops, when low oil pressure forced his retirement. This should have allowed teammate Arnoux to pick up the victory, but he was passed by Prost in the closing stages. Piquet finished third with Cheever fourth, Mansell sixth and Lauda rounding out the points. Prost now held a 14-point lead over Piquet, 51 points to 37, with Arnoux on 34 and Tambay on 31. Renault went back into the lead of the Constructors' Championship, three points ahead of Ferrari.

Race 12: Netherlands
Piquet took his first pole of the season at the Dutch Grand Prix at the Zandvoort circuit near Amsterdam, and led until lap 41, when Prost attempted to pass him. The two collided, and both were out on the spot. This left Arnoux to take victory for Ferrari, which turned into a 1–2 when Patrese suffered a problem near the end which dropped him to an eventual 9th. John Watson was third. A race of high attrition allowed for an unusual top six, with Derek Warwick, Mauro Baldi and Michele Alboreto rounding out the points. Johansson came home 7th for the new Spirit team. Arnoux now moved into second in the championship, eight points behind Prost. Tambay and Piquet were now joint third, 14 points behind the leader. Ferrari's lead in the Constructors' Championship, however, was now 12 points over Renault. Piquet's pole ended a run of ten consecutive pole positions by French drivers. This race saw McLaren join the turbo ranks when Lauda debuted the new TAG V6 engine, though Watson still drove the Cosworth-powered car.

Race 13: Italy
With three races left to run, the teams headed to Italy in early September. The Monza Autodrome near Milan,  saw the Ferrari lose pole to Patrese, placing second and third. Piquet jumped both Ferraris to run second behind his teammate in the opening laps, but it did not last long, as electric problems forced Patrese to retire on lap 3. Piquet was then unchallenged for the rest of the race, and came home to record his first victory since the opening race in Brazil, some six months before. Arnoux took second with Cheever third and Tambay fourth. Elio de Angelis scored his first points of the year with fifth, with Derek Warwick  scoring points for the second time in a row in sixth. The performances of Piquet and Arnoux, coupled with Prost's failure to score, left the championship in an uncertain position with two races left. Prost still led with 51, Arnoux had 49, Piquet 46 and Tambay 40 with 18 points left on the board. Ferrari maintained their lead, now with 17 points back to Renault.

Race 14: Europe (Brands Hatch, UK)
A third Grand Prix in the United States was supposed to be held at the Flushing Meadows–Corona Park in the New York City borough of Queens, but was canceled at short notice due to local protests. The British Brands Hatch circuit, just outside London, was able to organise a European Grand Prix in its place. Theodore travelled to the race with just one car, having insufficient funds for Johnny Cecotto to compete in the last two races. After the race, the team folded completely, and did not appear at all at the last race. The Spirit team also announced they would not travel to the last race, in preparation for their first full season in 1984. Williams had run a third car in the Brands Hatch race, for Jonathan Palmer. The British driver finished 13th, the only Williams to finish after Rosberg retired with an engine failure and Laffite failed to qualify.

The race saw de Angelis take the pole position for Lotus. The Italian was overtaken at the start by compatriot Patrese, who led until the first pit stops. After this, he slipped away from the pace, and an engine failure for de Angelis gave the lead to Piquet. He led until the finish, becoming the first driver all season to win two consecutive races. Prost fought through for second, with Mansell taking Lotus's first podium of the year with third. De Cesaris was fourth, while Toleman had both cars in the points, with Warwick ahead of Bruno Giacomelli.

The race left both championships in the balance with one race left. Prost still led, but now by only two points above Piquet. Arnoux could also be champion, but it would require him to win with Prost not scoring and Piquet no higher than fifth. Renault were still 11 points behind Ferrari.

Race 15: South Africa
The season finale was the South African Grand Prix at the fast, high-altitude Kyalami circuit between Johannesburg and Pretoria. Tambay took pole with Piquet, the best-positioned of the title contenders, in second. Arnoux was fourth with Prost fifth. If the race finished like that, Piquet would be champion. Piquet assumed the lead at the start to further enhance his chances. Prost fought his way up to third, while an early engine failure for Arnoux put him out of the running. With Prost in third and Patrese in second, Piquet's teammate kept Prost behind him. However, when Prost's turbo failed on lap 44, Piquet needed only to finish in the top four. He backed off, and eventually surrendered the lead to Patrese, who became the season's eighth winner. Piquet also allowed Lauda through into second place, but the Austrian's electrics failed three laps later. De Cesaris also passed Piquet before the end, securing his second podium of the year for Alfa Romeo. Third for Piquet was enough to secure him his second world championship, while Warwick once again finished in the points for Toleman in fourth. Rosberg and Cheever rounded out the points. Only two points separated Piquet and Prost at the end, the Frenchman having led in the title race for most of the season. Renault also lost the Constructors' Championship, with Ferrari securing the title for the second year in succession.

Results and standings

Grands Prix

The Argentinian Grand Prix scheduled for 30 January was cancelled for unknown reasons.
A Grand Prix in New York City, to be held on a temporary circuit at Flushing Meadows in Queens, was scheduled for 25 September, but after certain problems, the event was cancelled and replaced by the European Grand Prix at Brands Hatch.
The French Grand Prix was moved from July to April.
The Swiss Grand Prix was originally scheduled for 9 July at Dijon but was cancelled. 
Plans were made to host a Formula One event in Moscow for the 1983 season as the Grand Prix of the Soviet Union scheduled for 21 August, but these plans fell through due to bureaucratic barriers.
The Caesars Palace Grand Prix was scheduled for 9 October but was cancelled. This resulted in the 1983 calendar being cut from 19 races to 15.
The Belgian Grand Prix was moved from Circuit Zolder to Circuit de Spa-Francorchamps.

World Drivers' Championship standings

Championship points were awarded on a 9–6–4–3–2–1 basis to the top six finishers in each race.

World Constructors' Championship standings

Championship points were awarded on a 9–6–4–3–2–1 basis to the top six finishers in each race.

Non-championship race
The 1983 season also included a single race which did not count towards the World Championship, the 1983 Race of Champions. This remains the most recent non-championship Formula One race.

Notes and references

External links
 1983 Formula 1 review

Formula One seasons